Curt Otto Teich (March 1877 – 1974) was an American publisher of German descent who produced popular color postcards, primarily of scenes from American life. He was a pioneer of the offset printing process. Under his management, the Curt Teich & Company became the world's largest printer of view and advertising postcards.

Life 
Teich was born in Greiz, Thuringia (modern-day Germany), and, following his family's traditional career as printers and publishers, worked as a printer's apprentice in Lobenstein. He immigrated to the United States in 1895, where he initially worked as a printer's devil in New York, a much lower position than he had held in Germany.

Teich moved to Chicago, Illinois, and started his own firm—Curt Teich & Company—in January 1898.

Teich is best known for its "Greetings From" postcards with their big letters, vivid colors, and bold style. "Greetings From" postcards had originated in Germany in the 1890s, and Teich successfully imported the style to the American market after a visit in 1904. Teich employed hundreds of traveling salesmen, who sold picture postcards to domestic residences, and encouraged business to create advertising postcards; these salesmen also photographed the businesses and worked with the owners to create an idealized image.

The company closed in 1978. The Teich family donated archives of the company to the Lake County Discovery Museum in Illinois which started the Curt Teich Postcard Archive. In 2016, it was announced that the archives would be transferred to the Newberry Library. Altogether, the Newberry Library received approximately 2.5 million total items including near 500,000 postcard images. On April 3, 2017, the Curt Teich Postcard Archives Collection was opened to researchers.

Gallery

See also
 Tichnor Brothers

References

Further reading
 Harris, Moira F. "Curt Teich Postcards of Minnesota." Minnesota History 54: 7 (1995): 304–15.
 Meikle, Jeffrey L. Postcard America: Curt Teich and the Imaging of a Nation, 1931–1950. Austin: University of Texas Press, 2015.

External links
 Curt Teich Co. records at The Newberry
Teich Family papers at The Newberry
 Curt Teich Postcards in the NEW WEST, The Wagener-Erganian Collection  
 Curt Teich Postcard Archives Digital Collection, CARLI Digital Collections
 Curt Teich Company Postcard Dating Guide
Curt Teich postcards in the Bowden Postcard Collection Online, Walter Havighurst Special Collections in the Miami University Libraries 
 Curt Teich Co., 1898-1978, Metropostcard.com
 Jim Craig. The Picture Postcard King - Curt Otto Teich, December 30, 2016.

Postcard publishers
People from Deerfield, Illinois
1974 deaths
1877 births
Emigrants from the German Empire to the United States